The Roman Catholic Diocese of Sorsogon (Latin: Dioecesis Sorsogonensis) is a diocese of the Latin Church of the Roman Catholic Church in the Philippines. The diocese was established in 1951 by the Archdiocese of Caceres, and in 1968, the diocese was subdivided after the Diocese of Masbate separated. The diocese is a suffragan of the Archdiocese of Caceres.

Coat of arms
The volcano of Bulusan is surmounted by the keys and the sword that represent Saints Peter and Paul respectively who are titulars of the cathedral. The book with the lily surrounded by fishes represent Saint Anthony of Padua, Doctor of the Church and patron saint of the capital of Masbate which is within the territory of the diocese (until 1968). The fishes allude to one of the miracles attributed to the saint while still alive: when men did not listen to his preaching, he went to preach to the fishes which lifted up their heads above the water in wrapt attention.

Bishops

Ordinaries

Coadjutor bishop
Arturo Mandin Bastes, S.V.D. (2002-2003)

Auxiliary bishop
Concordio Maria Sarte † (1977-1980), appointed Bishop of Legazpi

Other priests of this diocese who became bishops
Manuel Platon Del Rosario † , appointed Coadjutor Bishop of Calbayog in 1955
José Tomás Sánchez † , appointed Auxiliary Bishop of Caceres in 1968

References

Sources
Catholic Church in the Philippines
The Official Website of the Roman Catholic Diocese of Sorsogon, Date Accessed: 11 June 2014
The Official Facebook Page of the Roman Catholic Diocese of Sorsogon, Date Accessed: 11 June 2014

Sorsogon
Sorsogon
Christian organizations established in 1951
Roman Catholic dioceses and prelatures established in the 20th century
Religion in Sorsogon
Sorsogon City
1951 establishments in the Philippines